Aleksei Nikolayevich Brovkin (23 February 1906 – April 1983) was a Soviet and Ukrainian militsiya general.

Biography
An ethnic Russian, Brovkin was born in family of stoker in Putyvl. His career he started as an intern at Verinsky Sugar Factory (Mykolayivka) and Sumy-Stepanivka Sugar Factory (Stepanivka), both located near Sumy. Later worked as a repairman at the Sumy Refined Sugar Factory. In 1930s worked at the Kharkiv Remmashtrest (a factory in repair of metal cutting machines) as director of some of its departments (design bureau, planning and production department) and later as chief engineer.

Just before the World War II, in 1939 Brovkin became a chief of Directorate of Local Fuel Industry in Kharkiv Oblast. In 1941 he became a secretary of engineering at the Kharkiv city committee of the Communist Party of Ukraine. During the evacuation of Soviet government, Brovkin was appointed as secretary of engineering of the Communist Party committee in Kupiansk and then Kuibyshev. In 1942-1946 he was working on leading positions of the All-Union Communist Party in Nizhny Tagil.

Following liberation of the Ukrainian SSR from the Nazi Germany occupation, in 1946-1954 Brovkin returned to Ukraine working at leading position of the Central Committee of the Communist Party of Ukraine including deputy chief of engineering department, deputy minister of MGB of UkrSSR, and deputy chief of department on party, trade union and Komsomol agencies. In 1954-1968 he worked at the Ministry of Interior of UkrSSR as deputy minister (including as chief of Militsiya Directorate), minister (1956-1962) and rector of the Kiev College of Ministry of Interior (today National Academy of Internal Affairs).

In 1968 Brovkin retired, but not for long. In 1970-1977 he worked as an engineer for DerzhPlan (State Planning Committee of the UkrSSR). In 1977 Brovkin retired.

References

External links
 Oleksiy Brovkin at Who is who of the Ukrainian confederation of journalists
 Petrov, N. ''Who governed the security agencies: 1941-1954. (Кто руководил органами госбезопасности: 1941-1954.). International Society "Memorial". "Zvenia". Moscow, 2010

1906 births
1983 deaths
People from Sumy Oblast
People from Putivlsky Uyezd
Russians in Ukraine
Central Committee of the Communist Party of Ukraine (Soviet Union) members
Soviet interior ministers of Ukraine
Fifth convocation members of the Verkhovna Rada of the Ukrainian Soviet Socialist Republic
Soviet major generals
Recipients of the Order of the Red Banner of Labour
Recipients of the Order of the Red Star